Canadian Pacific Camden Place Rail Bridge is a truss bridge that spans the Mississippi River in Minneapolis, Minnesota. This bridge is the official end of the navigable channel for river traffic.  It was built in 1905 by the Minneapolis, St. Paul and Sault Ste. Marie Railway.  In 1977, the bridge was modified to allow higher clearance under the center span.  This was done by replacing the deck truss span with a shallower girder span. It is the main line crossing of the Mississippi River for the Canadian Pacific Railway transcontinental (Soo Line Railroad) line.

See also
List of crossings of the Upper Mississippi River

References
 

Canadian Pacific Railway bridges in the United States
Truss bridges in the United States
Bridges in Minneapolis
Bridges over the Mississippi River
Railroad bridges in Minnesota
Bridges completed in 1905
Soo Line Railroad
Girder bridges in the United States
1905 establishments in Minnesota